Railroad Township is one of nine townships in Starke County, in the U.S. state of Indiana. As of the 2010 census, its population was 1,226 and it contained 549 housing units.

Geography
It is bordered on the north by the Kankakee River.

Cities, towns, villages
 San Pierre

Unincorporated towns
 English Lake at 
 Lomax at 
(This list is based on USGS data and may include former settlements.)

Adjacent townships
 Dewey Township, LaPorte County (north)
 Jackson Township (northeast)
 Prairie Township, LaPorte County (northeast)
 Wayne Township (east)
 Rich Grove Township, Pulaski County (southeast)
 Cass Township, Pulaski County (south)
 Walker Township, Jasper County (southwest)
 Kankakee Township, Jasper County (west)
 Pleasant Township, Porter County (northwest)

Cemeteries
The township contains All Saints Cemetery.

Major highways

School districts
 North Judson-San Pierre School Corporation
Tri-Township School Corporation
West Central School Corporation
Kankakee Valley School Corporation

Political districts
 Indiana's 2nd congressional district
 State House District 17
 State Senate District 5

References
 United States Census Bureau 2008 TIGER/Line Shapefiles
 United States Board on Geographic Names (GNIS)
 IndianaMap

External links
 Indiana Township Association
 United Township Association of Indiana

Townships in Starke County, Indiana
Townships in Indiana